Falketind is a mountain in Dovre Municipality in Innlandet county, Norway. The mountain is surrounded by several other notable mountains including Blåberget to the north, Gråhøe to the southeast, Halvfarhøe to the south, and Storhøe and Fokstuguhøi to the southwest.

See also
List of mountains of Norway

References

Dovre
Mountains of Innlandet